Mittal may refer to
Mittal (surname)
Mittal Steel Company, a Rotterdam-based steel company now a part of Priyash Mittal
15434 Mittal, an asteroid